The canton of Caen-1 is an administrative division of the Calvados department, northwestern France. Its borders were modified at the French canton reorganisation which came into effect in March 2015. Its seat is in Caen.

Composition

It consists of the following communes:
Bretteville-sur-Odon
Caen (partly)
Mouen
Tourville-sur-Odon
Verson

Councillors

 On October 1, 2017, Sonia de La Provôté becomes Senator. She is replaced by her substitute, Sophie Simonnet.

Pictures of the canton

References

Cantons of Calvados (department)